Kuno Ruben Gabriel (1929–2003) was a statistician known for the inventing the biplot and the Gabriel graph and for his work in statistical meteorology.

Gabriel was born in Germany, emigrated to France, grew up in Israel, was educated at the London School of Economics and the Hebrew University of Jerusalem, taught at the Hebrew University until 1975, and then moved to the University of Rochester where he remained until his retirement in 1997. He died on May 25, 2003.

He was a fellow of the American Statistical Association and the Institute of Mathematical Statistics, and was an elected member of the International Statistical Institute.

References

1929 births
2003 deaths
Israeli statisticians
Alumni of the London School of Economics
Hebrew University of Jerusalem alumni
Academic staff of the Hebrew University of Jerusalem
University of Rochester faculty
Fellows of the American Statistical Association
Fellows of the Institute of Mathematical Statistics
Elected Members of the International Statistical Institute
American statisticians